The 2013 MSA British Rally Championship season was the 55th season of the British Rally Championship. The season began on 6 April in Welshpool and ended on 18 October in Poole.

Season summary
Finnish driver Jukka Korhonen lead the championship after four events having taken two victories and a second place.

Race calendar and results

The 2013 calendar consists of seven rounds.

Drivers championship standings

Points are awarded to the highest placed registered driver on each event as follows: 20, 18, 16, 15, and so on deleting one point per placing down to one single point for all finishers.

References

External links
Official Website

British Rally Championship seasons
Rally Championship
British Rally Championship